Robert Whitaker or Whittaker may refer to:

Robert Whittaker (fighter) (born 1990), Australian mixed martial artist
Robert Whitaker (equestrian) (born 1983), British showjumper
Robert Whitaker (author) (active since 1989), American author
Robert Whitaker (surgeon) (active since 1973), British author, surgeon and anatomist
Robert Whitaker (photographer) (1939–2011), British photographer
Robert Whittaker (cricketer) (1908–1990), English cricketer
Robert Whittaker (American football) (1904–1990), American football player and coach
Robert Whittaker (ecologist) (1920–1980), American vegetation ecologist
Robert Whittaker (British Army officer) (1894–1967), British Army major
Robert Whitaker (minister) (1863–1944), Baptist minister and political activist
Robert H. Whittaker (politician), American member of the Virginia House of Delegates

See also
Bob Whittaker (born 1939), U.S. representative from Kansas